Aero-Difusión SL is a Spanish aircraft manufacturer. It was founded at Santander in 1955, licence-building Jodel and Druine light aircraft.

Aircraft produced by Aero-Difusión, S.L.
Aero-Difusión D11 Compostela(1950) Single-engine two-seat low-wing monoplane with fixed tailwheel undercarriage.  Licence-built version of French Jodel D11
Aero-Difusión D-112 PopuplaneLicence-built version of Jodel D11
Aero-Difusión D-119 PopuplaneLicence-built version of Jodel D11
Aero-Difusión D-1190S CompostelaLicence-built version of Jodel D11

References
 Gunston, Bill. (1993) World Encyclopaedia of Aircraft Manufacturers. Naval Institute Press: Annapolis, Maryland. p. 12

Aircraft manufacturers of Spain